"Still Not a Player" is the second single from Big Pun's debut album Capital Punishment. The song was produced by Knobody and features R&B singer Joe.

Composition
The song is a remix of Big Pun's previous single "I'm Not a Player" produced by Minnesota and contains an interpolation of Joe's "Don't Wanna Be a Player". It also samples "A Little Bit of Love" by Brenda Russell. In addition to samples, the song contains interpolations of Earth, Wind & Fire's "Brazilian Rhyme (Beijo)"; towards the end of the song, the refrain "Punisher...Punisher...Punisher, Big Punisher" is sung to the tune and rhythm of the lead vocals from the track.

Chart performance
The song peaked at No. 24 on the Billboard Hot 100 and at No. 6 on the Billboard Hot R&B/Hip-Hop Songs chart, making it the most successful single released by Big Pun. It was ranked the 108th best song of 1980-2005 by Blender magazine, and was ranked #76 on VH1's list of the 100 Greatest Hip Hop Songs.

Music video
Cormega, Onyx, the Beatnuts, Guru, Tony Touch and Loud Records R&B artist Davina all made featured appearances in the music video as cameos.

Cover versions and samples
In the Up in Smoke Tour in 2000, Snoop Dogg and Dr. Dre played this song as a tribute to Big Pun. The song was also remixed by Incubus which featured Big Pun's vocals on the 2000 rap rock album Loud Rocks, released 7 months after his death.

A demo version of the song featuring former Terror Squad member Cuban Link leaked 14 years after the song's initial release.

The song was sampled in Ariana Grande's 2013 single "The Way", which also samples Brenda Russell's "A Little Bit of Love".

Charts

References

External links
 

1998 songs
1998 singles
Big Pun songs
Joe (singer) songs
Music videos directed by Darren Grant
Songs written by Big Pun
Loud Records singles
RCA Records singles